This list of health related charity fundraisers includes events designed to raise funds to fight disease and improve health.

Bike rides

Climbs

Runs
Note that all runs allow jogging and walking.

Race for the Cure, Team Heather (2003-Current)

Walks

Poker Tournament

Dance fitness

References

Health-related fundraisers
Health related charity fundraisers